G. africanus may refer to:
 Gigantosaurus africanus, a dinosaur species
 Gyps africanus, the white-backed vulture, an Old World vulture species

See also
 Africanus (disambiguation)